Carlo Mollino (6 May 1905 – 27 August 1973) was an Italian architect, designer, photographer and educator.

Biography 

Carlo Mollino was born on May 6, 1905, in Turin, a major industrial city and cultural center in northwest Italy. He was the only son of Jolanda Testa (1884-1966) and Eugenio Mollino (1873-1953), a prolific engineer who built more than 300 buildings of the most diverse types.

Carlo Mollino graduated in architecture in July 1931 at the Royal Superior School of Architecture in Turin. Before and after graduation he collaborated with his father who mentored him in the design of technical architectural elements and had him oversee construction sites.

Only in 1933 he began his personal career winning a competition for the construction of an office building in Cuneo and writing "The Life of Oberon", a fictional short story published in the architectural magazine Casabella.

During the war years he wrote a volume of photographic history and criticism, Message from the Darkroom (Il Messaggio dalla Camera Oscura, published in 1949), and a manual of skiing technique, Introduction to Downhill Skiing (Introduzione al Discesismo, published in 1950).

In the 1940s he began to write essays on architecture and from 1949 up until his death he taught at the Faculty of Architecture in Turin, becoming a full professor in 1953. 

In 1955 he designed a car, the Bisiluro, which competed that year in the 24 Hours of Le Mans. In 1956 he began to fly specializing in aerobatics and later participated in Italian and European competitions.

Carlo Mollino did not marry and had no children, he experienced an important love story with the sculptor Carmelina Piccolis between 1948 and 1955.

He passed away on the early afternoon of August 27, 1973, while working in his studio.

Architecture 
Thanks to an extended apprenticeship with his civil engineer father before, during, and after studying architecture, Carlo Mollino is highly skilled in a range of building technologies and materials while commanding all aspects of the construction process (for example he produces working drawings for the doors and windows of most of his buildings).

In the summer of 1931, right after graduation from architecture school in Turin, Mollino travels to Berlin where he meets Erich Mendelsohn. The direct contact with Expressionism has a lasting impact upon his architectural design as can already be seen in the first building he completed, the Farmers' Federation in Cuneo (Sede Federazione Agricoltori, 1933-35).

In 1933 Mollino publishes a multi-part short-story entitled The Life of Oberon (Vita di Oberon), in the prominent architectural journal Casabella. It is a personal manifesto of his way of looking at and practicing architecture written as prose fiction. It is with this manifesto, which bears traces of Futurism for which he had a youthful infatuation, that Mollino symbolically begins a creative journey in which he would consistently combines a dual role as architect and storyteller.

In 1934 Mollino begins to explore Surrealism, a movement that remained a constant source of fascination throughout his life, publishing in August his second short-story, The Duke’s Lover (L’amante del duca, 1934-36), a dreamlike fiction whose protagonist is the imaginary architect Faust.The Horse Riding Club of Turin (Società Ippica Torinese, 1937-40), is Mollino’s first masterpiece and his first opportunity to give shape to a modern surrealist architecture that extended his interior designs and furniture completed in the 1930s in order to “move the concepts of surreal interior space towards an intransigently functional unity".

In 1941, Mollino publishes an article about the Turinese architect-engineer Alessandro Antonelli made famous by his towering Mole, which reveals the beginning of a strong interest in the “organic”, not to be understood as a reference to the architecture of Frank Lloyd Wright; rather he is interested in the structures of animal and plant organisms as a source of investigation and inspiration for his designs ranging from coat hangers to buildings. In those same years Mollino theorizes a new form of “synthetic eclecticism” based on a consideration of architecture as being a language. During this period of time dominated by the Second World War, Mollino writes a number of articles and books about art, architecture, photography, and skiing; he writes with the point of view of a practicing designer, thus further consolidating his identity of architect and storyteller.  

Just as the war ends, he puts into practice his ideas about architecture as language by designing the most influential of his buildings, the Lago Nero Sled Station (Slittovia del Lago Nero, 1946-1947). Its structure is made up of cutting-edge Vierendeel trusses integrated with a traditional interlocking log enclosure; Mollino thus created an extraordinarily dynamic and three-dimensional building. The building, which he himself defined a "flying chalet", is inspired by the traditional Walser alpine architecture that Mollino studied in the summer of 1930 and for which he produced remarkably analytical drawings. The Lago Nero Sled Station is part of a group of projects such as the unbuilt Casa Capriata (1945) and the Casa del Sole (1945-54) in Cervinia that are inspired by traditional vernacular architecture reworked in modernist terms.

In 1945, together with the sculptor Umberto Mastroianni, Mollino wins the competition for a war memorial that was completed in 1947 for the Monumental Cemetery on the outskirts of Turin.

In 1950 he wins the competition for the redesign of the interior of Turin’s RAI Auditorium within an existing building.

In 1952 he designs the Casa Cattaneo on a site overlooking the Lake Maggiore; the two-story house is composed of a long stretching cantilevered beam supported at one end by two leg-shaped pillars, resembling an animal crouching on the lawn slope, ready to jump.

The death of his father in December 1953 throws Mollino into a personal crisis that eventually led him to abandon his architectural practice for several years in favor of other activities such as automobile design, flying aerobatics and nude photography.

Finally, in 1959 he returns to architecture participating in the competition for an exhibition pavilion to be erected in Turin in occasion of the celebration of the hundred years of Italy’s unification. From this moment on, his large-scale urban buildings, which continue to function today, are characterized by reinforced concrete structures; these include the Chamber of Commerce of Turin (1965-73) and the Regio Opera House (Teatro Regio di Torino, 1973). The Regio Opera House, an important part of the monumental Piazza Castello, provides fantastic spaces in which Mollino translates the imaginary visions of Piranesi's Prisons into a labyrinthine brutalist curved space on four levels that constitutes the foyer of the theater.

Buildings 
Offices of the Farmers' Federation (Sede Federazione Agricoltori, 1933-35, Cuneo, extant)
Horse Riding Club of Turin (Società Ippica Torinese, 1937-40, Turin, demolished in 1960)
Monument to the Fallen (Monumento ai caduti per la libertà, 1945-47, Turin monumental cemetery, extant)
Casa del Sole (1945-54, Cervinia, extant)
Lago Nero Sled Station (Slittovia del lago Nero, 1946-47, Sauze d'Oulx, extant)
RAI Auditorium (1950-52, Turin, extant with major modifications)
Casa Linot (1951-1952, Bardonecchia, extant)
Apartment Building on Viale Maternità (Casa ad alloggi sul Viale Maternità, 1951-1953, extant)
Casa Cattaneo (1952, 1953, Agra, extant)
Casa Olivero (1962, La Thuile, extant)
Taleuc Rascard (Baita Taleuc, 1963-65, Champoluc, extant)
Chamber of Commerce of Turin (Camera di commercio, 1964-73, Turin, extant)
Regio Opera House (Teatro Regio di Torino, 1965-73, Turin, extant)

Interior Design and Furniture 

Carlo Mollino’s furniture design is undoubtedly the most recognized part of his work; his pieces reached the highest prices on the international 20th-century art and design market.

Yet Mollino has been especially interested and worked mainly as an interior designer. His furniture is intended to be part of a whole, playing a specific role within the space of an overall interior design. Occasionally he also experimented with single pieces of furniture typically designed for exhibitions.

He never designed for companies nor were his pieces mass-produced. He was not an industrial designer, yet he tackled the problem of industrial production and especially his last designs, those between 1950-53, would have well suited mass-production, even though he never pursued such a possibility.

His 1930s interior designs are particularly significant since Mollino was one of the very first architects, internationally speaking, to merge Surrealism with the Modern Movement, effectively responding to the question of what Surrealist Modern architecture might look like.

After publishing a study on the engineer Alessandro Antonelli in 1941, Mollino entered a second phase of his design ideas. He began to think of an interior space as a metaphorical natural setting, he enriched the surrealist theme with the one of the “organic”. The structures and the aesthetics of the organisms, whether plants or animals, became a model for his furniture which took on extremely three-dimensional, dynamic and expressive forms.

The third phase of his design dates to 1950 when he exhibited at Italy at Work, Her Renaissance in Design Today, a show opening at the Brooklyn Museum in New York. He began to use plywood and simplified his furniture and interiors in a modernist way, while posing particular design attention to the joints binding the components making up the furniture.

After 1954 Mollino became substantially disinterested in interior and furniture designs; few interesting examples exist after that date among which the Lutrario Ballroom, 1959-60, and Casa Mollino, 1960-68, his last interior design, today a museum.

Apartments and interiors 
Casa Miller, Turin (1936)
Casa D'Errico, Turin (1937)
Casa Devalle I, Turin (1939)
Casa Devalle II, Turin (1940)
Casa A. and C. Minola, Turin (1944-46)
Casa F. and G. Minola, Turin (1945-46)
Casa Orengo, Turin (1949)
Casa Rivetti, Turin (1949)
Lattes Publishing House (Casa Editrice Lattes), Turin (1951)
Lutrario ballroom (Sala da ballo Lutrario), Turin (1959-1960)
Casa Mollino, Turin (1960-1968)
Casa Pistoi, Turin (1966-67)

Works and projects unrealized 
 House on the Hill (Casa in Collina), published in Domus, 182, February 1943
 Bedroom for a Farmhouse in the rice field (Camera da letto per una cascina in risaia), published in Domus, 181, January 1943
 House on the Heights (Casa sull’altura), published in Stile, 40, April 1944
 Truss House (Casa Capriata), published in Domus, 230, 1948
 Apartment building in Sanremo (Casa a Sanremo), published in Domus, 243, February 1950
 Casa Rama, published in Spazio, 2, August 1950
 Fürggen Cable Car Arrival Station (Stazione d’arrivo funivia del Fürggen), published in Prospettive, 1, December 1951
 Gallery of Modern Art of Turin (Galleria d’Arte Moderna), published in Prospettive, 6, July-August 1953
 Exhibition Hall for Italia ’61 (Palazzo del lavoro, Italia 61), published in Casabella Continuità, 235, January 1960 and in Architectural Forum, 112, May 1960

Photography 

Beginning in 1934, the date of his first signed photograph, Carlo Mollino engages with B&W photography for over a decade, following two directions. On the one hand, he focuses mainly on female portraits, more rarely on images of interiors and skis, signing his unique prints as fine art works, publishing and exhibiting them in photographic shows. These portraits are formally close to the dreamlike and refined shots of Man Ray and Erwin Blumenfeld, although enriched with literary quotes and architectural settings of his design.

On the other hand, Mollino accurately photographs his own interior and architecture designs for publication in architectural magazines. This body of work is particularly interesting since photography, also thanks to the systematic use of retouching and photomontage techniques, becomes the tool for accomplishing his idea of architecture while emphasizing its surrealist component.

In December 1943 Mollino finishes the typescript for his large volume Message from the Darkroom on photography history and critique. Published in 1949, the book asserts in theoretical terms the transfigurative quality of the photographic medium only veiled by its objective appearance. The book is written in a cultured and sophisticated style and gives evidence of Mollino’s up-to-date and wide-ranging knowledge of photography.

From the late 1930s he also commits to ski photography especially portraying Leo Gasperl, the stylish trainer of the Italian national alpine ski team. A number of these images are signed as fine art works, others are published in magazines or in his volume on skiing technique, Introduction to Downhill Skiing.

After a few years pause from photography, in 1956 Mollino engages in nude photography, staging the photos within interiors and furnishings he has designed.

For this purpose, he rents the annex of Villa Scalero on the beautiful Turin hillside while he sets about choosing and purchasing a large amount of women’s clothing and accessories. Using his Leica, he conceives a new genre of nude which is in dialogue with art history yet at the same time imbued with an explicit eroticism never before allowed in art photography; it also absorbs cues from the popular culture of contemporary lifestyle and fashion magazines. For these prints Mollino makes extensive use of retouching, i.e. redrawing the bodies’ silhouettes and shadings on the prints.

In 1962 he abandons the photographic set of Villa Scalero, not without having first purchased a small villa, in a panoramic position still on the Turin hillside, which he baptizes Villa Zaira. Once again, he redesigns the interior space in which he sets up his studio and – while continuing to buy large amounts of 1960s female clothing and lingerie – pioneers the use of the Polaroid camera. This last body of work, though less elegant and formally perfect than his 1950s nude photographs, creates a more psychologically complex and modern erotism. The hundreds of nude photos he took between 1956-1973 were never exhibited until the 1980s.

References

Further reading 

 Ferrari, Napoleone; Sabatino, Michelangelo. Carlo Mollino Architect and Storyteller. Zürich: Park Books, 2021.
Ferrari, Fulvio; Ferrari, Napoleone. The furniture of Carlo Mollino. London: Phaidon, 2006.
Irace, Fulvio (ed.). Carlo Mollino 1905-1973. Milan: Electa, 1989.
François Burkhardt (ed.). L'étrange univers de l'architecte Carlo Mollino. Paris: Centre Georges Pompidou, 1989.
Ferrari, Napoleone; Ferrari, Fulvio. Carlo Mollino Photographs 1956-1962. Turin: AdArte, 2006.
Ferrari, Fulvio; Ferrari, Napoleone. Carlo Mollino Polaroids. Santa Fe: Arena, 2002 (2nd edition, Bologna: Damiani, 2014).
Comba, Michela (ed.). Carlo Mollino. Architettura di Parole. Turin: Bollati Boringhieri, 2007.
Ferrari, Fulvio; Ferrari, Napoleone (eds.). Carlo Mollino Arabesques. Milan: Electa, 2006.
Viale, G., (2022) “When the Modern Was the Tradition: Carlo Mollino at Sestriere and His Last Unpublished project (1973)”, Architectural Histories 10(1). doi: https://doi.org/10.16995/ah.8641 https://journal.eahn.org/article/id/8641/

External links 
www.carlomollino.org
Complete bibliography of Carlo Mollino's essays and books
biography, photos, polaroids, furniture, Casa Mollino 

1905 births
1973 deaths
Architects from Turin
Italian designers
20th-century Italian architects